J.-Armand Ménard (12 July 1905 – 7 October 1973) was a Liberal party member of the House of Commons of Canada. Born in Saint-Alexandre-d'Iberville, Quebec, he was an industrialist by career.

On 23 February 1953 Ménard was elected mayor of Saint-Jean, Quebec (St. Johns). He had already served as an alderman for the municipal council. He remained mayor until 1957.

Ménard entered federal politics when he won a by-election at the Saint-Jean—Iberville—Napierville on 19 December 1955. He was re-elected in the 1957 federal election and completed his only full federal term, the 23rd Canadian Parliament after which he did not seek re-election in the 1958 election.

References

External links
 

1905 births
1973 deaths
Members of the House of Commons of Canada from Quebec
Liberal Party of Canada MPs
People from Montérégie
French Quebecers